Luke Garrard (born 22 September 1985) is an English former professional footballer who manages National League club Boreham Wood.

Career
Garrard started his career as a trainee at Tottenham Hotspur but was released as a schoolboy. He went on to sign as an apprentice for Swindon Town, making his professional league debut against Oldham Athletic on 26 April 2003. Between 2002 and 2005, Garrard made 17 appearances for Swindon, before being released on 19 April 2005.

Garrard went on to have spells with Bishop's Stortford, Boreham Wood and Northwood, before joining AFC Wimbledon in March 2006.

A popular figure with Wimbledon's fans, he made over 100 appearances for the club, mainly in a right side defensive role, but in November 2008 Garrard picked up an injury during training that kept him out for the rest of that season. From the start of the 2009–10 season, he made only occasional appearances for the team and eventually in January 2010, he was allowed to re-join Boreham Wood after his request for regular first team football could not be guaranteed.

Coaching career
On 14 October 2015, Garrard was appointed manager, following the resignation of Ian Allinson, making him the youngest boss in all of England's top five divisions.

In Garrard's third season in charge, he led Boreham Wood to the National League play-offs for the first time. His side defeated AFC Fylde and Sutton United to set up a play-off final with Tranmere Rovers at Wembley Stadium in which Garrard's side were defeated 2–1. Also in this season, Boreham Wood defeated Football League opposition for the first time in their history when they defeated League One side Blackpool in the FA Cup First Round.

In the 2021–22 season, Boreham Wood reached the Fifth Round of the FA Cup for the first time in their history. Having reached the Third Round, his side defeated League One side AFC Wimbledon 2–0 before winning away at Championship promotion chasers AFC Bournemouth 1–0. His side were eventually defeated 2–0 at Premier League club Everton.

Managerial Statistics

Honours

Player 
AFC Wimbledon
 Conference South: 2008–09
 Isthmian League Premier Division play-offs: 2008

East Barnet Old Grammarians
 Old Boys Veteran's Cup: Finalist (losing) 2021-22 

Individual
 AFC Wimbledon Young Player of the Year: 2006–07

Manager 
Boreham Wood

 Herts Senior Cup: 2017–18, 2018–19
 National League Play-offs runner up: 2018

Individual

 National League Manager of the Month: February 2022, December 2020

References

External links

 (Swindon Town)
 (AFC Wimbledon & Boreham Wood)

1985 births
Living people
English footballers
Association football defenders
Tottenham Hotspur F.C. players
Swindon Town F.C. players
Bishop's Stortford F.C. players
Northwood F.C. players
AFC Wimbledon players
Boreham Wood F.C. players
English Football League players
National League (English football) players
Isthmian League players
Southern Football League players
English football managers
Boreham Wood F.C. managers
National League (English football) managers
Footballers from the London Borough of Barnet